The Granada Theatre is a theatre located in Emporia, Kansas, United States. It was listed on the National Register of Historic Places in 1985 and was designed by the Boller Brothers.

History
The Granada Theatre was constructed in 1929 at a cost of $350,000 ($ in  dollars). The theatre was dedicated on October 3, 1929, in a speech by “The Sage of Emporia,” William Allen White. During its early years, the theatre attracted many famous performers. In addition to screening movies, it was used for everything from beauty contests to traveling vaudeville acts. It was leased for many years to the Fox Corporation and became known as the Fox Theatre.

Architect Robert O. Boller, of Boller Brothers, Architects, designed the Granada Theatre. Boller Brothers were nationally known theatre designers with offices in Kansas City and Los Angeles.

Like many grand old movie palaces of its era, the Granada's popularity declined during the 1960s and 70s. During this period, the building suffered from neglect and damage resulting from a leaking roof. It was closed in 1982. In April 1985, the theatre was placed on the National Register of Historic Places, but, it was not until demolition threatened the building in 1994 that a group of citizens rallied to save the theatre.

In cooperation with the Kansas Preservation Alliance, the Emporia Granada Theatre Alliance was formed and acquired the building, saving it from destruction. Since then, the Alliance members and numerous volunteers have spent countless hours stabilizing and renovating the outside of the building and preparing for the interior phase of the project. Working cooperatively with other local arts, cultural and tourism organizations, the Alliance has developed a plan to make the Granada Theatre a keystone facility – a place that builds community.

Board of directors
When the Emporia Granada Theatre Alliance bought the Granada Theatre in 1994, they set up a Board of Directors to oversee everything done at the theatre. They raised money for renovating the theatre, as well. The Director of the Granada Theatre, Brian Williams, also reports to them.

Executive Members: 

 Kristi Henrikson-Mohn, President
 Gary Andrews, Vice-President
 Harry Stephens, Past-President
 Janis Meyer, Treasurer
 Mary Sue Wade, Secretary
 Sarah Harbaugh, Executive at Large
 Brad Harzman, Executive at Large

Full Board Membership: 

 Sue Blechl
 Scott Bolley
 Dr. William H. Clamurro
 Tyler Curtis
 Mary Downing
 Staci Hammon
 Rachel LeClear
 Roy Mann
 Janet Miley

 Janelle North
 Paula Sauder
 Dave Stormont
 Beth Thomas
 Tom Thompson
 Marge Trayer
 Jan Traylor
 Mike TurnBull
 Norma Watson

Notable performances

 Joseph Hall, Top 10 finalist of America's Got Talent (season 3)
 Oak Ridge Boys
 The Bellamy Brothers
 Kelley Hunt
 Granger Smith (a.k.a. Earl Dibbles, Jr.)
 Juice Newton & Exile
 Joe Diffie
 Marty Stuart & the Fabulous Superlatives
 Lorrie Morgan
 Kansas
 Wynonna Judd
 Lita Ford

References

External links
 Official website

Theatres completed in 1929
Buildings and structures in Lyon County, Kansas
Emporia, Kansas
Theatres in Kansas
Theatres on the National Register of Historic Places in Kansas
National Register of Historic Places in Lyon County, Kansas